Ralja is a village in the municipality of Smederevo, Serbia. According to the 2002 census, the village has a population of 1,537.

References

Ralja is near Zelezara ( ex USStell ) which is one of biggest factories in Serbia.  
Ralja is also a football team with football stadium with capacity of 1000 seats.

Populated places in Podunavlje District